

Military forces
 Light Brigade (Belgium), part of the Belgian military
 Light Brigade, a brigade within the Light Division of England
 19th Light Brigade of the British Army
 Light brigade, a light cavalry brigade
 Light brigade, a light infantry brigade
 The Light Brigade, a Napoleonic era British infantry formation consisting of the 43rd (Monmouthshire) Regiment of Foot, the 52nd (Oxfordshire) Regiment of Foot, and the 95th Rifles
 The cavalry formation that executed the Charge of the Light Brigade during the Crimean War in 1854
 1st Light Brigade, part of the Wehrmacht that later became the 6th Panzer Division
 13th Light Brigade of the Royal Netherlands Army
 3rd Light Armoured Brigade of the French Army
 6th Light Armoured Brigade of the French Army
 9th Light Armoured Marine Brigade, name of the French Army 9th Marine Infantry Brigade from 1999 to 2013

Other uses
 The Light Brigade (disambiguation)
 Charge of the Light Brigade (disambiguation)
 Light Brigade, a clipper ship built in Medford, Massachusetts in 1854 that was originally named Ocean Telegraph